Henry Herbert, 10th Earl of Pembroke, 7th Earl of Montgomery (3 July 173426 January 1794) of Wilton House in Wiltshire, was an English peer, politician and courtier who served as a Lord of the Bedchamber to King George III in 1769. He was renowned for his skill in horse breaking. Captain Cook's famous ship, HMS Endeavour, was formerly MS Earl of Pembroke, launched in 1765 and named after the 10th Earl.

Origins
He was the son and heir of Henry Herbert, 9th Earl of Pembroke (1693–1749), of Wilton House, by his wife Mary FitzWilliam, a daughter of Richard FitzWilliam, 5th Viscount FitzWilliam and Frances Shelley. Through this marriage his son inherited the substantial FitzWilliam properties in Dublin and FitzWilliam House at Richmond Green in Surrey, which he renamed "Pembroke House".

Career

He was educated at Eton College, and was styled Lord Herbert until he succeeded to his father's earldom in 1749. He became a Lieutenant-General in the Army, later Colonel of the 1st Regiment of Dragoons. 

He became an authority on breaking cavalry horses and in 1755 built an indoor Riding School at Wilton House and commissioned 55 paintings of military riding exercises which now hang in the Large Smoking Room at Wilton. In 1756 he married the 19-year-old Lady Elizabeth Spencer (January/March 1737–30 April 1831), a daughter of Charles Spencer, 3rd Duke of Marlborough by his wife Elizabeth Trevor. As his London townhouse he purchased 40 Queen Anne Street, Marylebone which he used for entertaining during the "London season". This must have been before 1760, as early that year he was despatched with his regiment to Germany to take part in the Seven Years' War as a Major-General in command of the Cavalry Brigade in Germany until the following year. 

In 1761, he wrote the British Army's manual on riding, Military Equitation: or A Method of Breaking Horses, and Teaching Soldiers to Ride, which had already reached a 4th edition by 1793, and his methods were adopted throughout the British cavalry.

Henry was appointed a Lord of the Bedchamber to George III in 1769, and advanced to the rank of General in 1782.

Marriage and children
On 23 March 1756 he married the 19-year-old Lady Elizabeth Spencer (January/March 1737–30 April 1831), a daughter of Charles Spencer, 3rd Duke of Marlborough by his wife Elizabeth Trevor. By Elizabeth he had issue as follows:
George Augustus Herbert, 11th Earl of Pembroke, 8th Earl of Montgomery (1759–1827), son and heir, who married firstly in 1787, Elizabeth Beauclerk and secondly in 1808 Countess Catherine Romanovitch.
Charlotte Herbert (1773–1784), who died from consumption at age 10.

Mistresses

He had several mistresses amongst whom were:
Kitty Hunter, whom he met on his return to England in January 1762, and, disguised as a sailor, eloped with to the Low Countries having left a note for his wife. Horace Walpole commented:
"As Pembroke a horseman by most is accounted
'Tis not strange his Lordship a Hunter has mounted."
On Henry's recall to the Army in Germany, the pregnant Kitty returned to England and on 23 November 1762 gave birth to their child Augustus Retnuh Reebkomp (died 6 February 1797) whose middle name spelt "Hunter" backwards and whose surname was an anagram of "Pembroke". He later adopted the surname "Montgomery". Henry returned to England in February 1763 and was reconciled to his wife in March.
Second mistress, with whom Henry had another affair in Venice in 1768, apparently carrying the lady off on the very night of her wedding to someone else. She gave birth to their illegitimate child Caroline Medkaff that year or the next.

Death
He died at Wilton at the age of 59.

Notes

Sources
 Images of Kitty Hunter
 Henry, Elizabeth and George: Letters and Diaries of Henry, 10th Earl of Pembroke and his Circle (1734–80), 16th Earl, 1939, repub as: The Pembroke Papers vol. I (1734–80), 1942–50.
 The Pembroke Papers vol. II (1780–94), 16th Earl, 1950, [EUL] 9(42073) Pem.

1734 births
1794 deaths
Henry Herbert, 10th Earl of Pembroke
British Army generals
10
Henry
Lord-Lieutenants of Wiltshire
British Army personnel of the Seven Years' War
People educated at Eton College